Unionville-Sebewaing Area High School (USA High School) is a public high school located in Sebewaing, Michigan, United States.  It was formed in 1972 when Unionville High School and Sebewaing High School merged.

The school has won 2 state football championships, seven girls' softball championships (2006, 2007, 2009, 2015, 2016, 2019 and 2021), and multiple state wrestling titles, among many other state championship appearances and high advancement in playoffs.

The school is also known for its technology program. USA School has received state and national awards for its academic and technology programs. USA School is a Professional Learning Community (PLC) School and is NCA High School.

Notable alumni 
Troy Houthoofd (1979) - 1979 Parade High School Football All American and 1979 Track and Field High School All American

See also
Michigan Sugar Festival, a festival in Sebewaing, Michigan

References

School website

Public high schools in Michigan
Educational institutions established in 1972
Schools in Huron County, Michigan
1972 establishments in Michigan